Saule is a traditional Lithuanian and Kazakh female name. The meaning of the name is interpreted as a sunlight or sun. The history of the name goes back to the history of Zoroastrianism.

Persons
Saule Iskakova (born 1972), Russian singer and actress
Saule Omarova (born 1966), American attorney, academic, and public policy advisor

Feminine given names